Orehova Vas may refer to several places in Slovenia:
Orehova Vas, Hoče–Slivnica, a settlement in the Municipality of Hoče–Slivnica
Orehova Vas, Pečica, a hamlet of Pečica in the Municipality of Šmarje pri Jelšah